Ahmet Celal Cem Say (born 14 March 1966 in Ankara) is a Turkish theoretical computer scientist and professor of computer science. He is a full time professor at the Boğaziçi University Department of Computer Engineering in Istanbul, Turkey. Cem Say is the author of the QSI algorithm for qualitative system identification, an AI task relevant in the study of qualitative reasoning. His work in complexity theory includes studies on small-space quantum automata and new characterizations of the complexity classes NL and P in terms of verifiers modeled by finite-state machines allowed to use only a fixed number of random bits. He is also known for his advocacy of people wrongly accused with forged digital evidence, and his popular science books.

Education
Cem Say was born in Ankara in 1966. He finished the high school TED Ankara College in 1983. He graduated from Boğaziçi University's Department of Computer Engineering in 1987. He received his PhD  in the same department under the supervision of Selahattin Kuru in 1992.

Academic career
He is a full time professor at the Department of Computer Engineering in Boğaziçi University since 1992.  
He has been an active researcher, having published more than 80 scientific manuscripts with more than 700 citations.

Research areas
His research interests include theoretical computer science, quantum computing, artificial intelligence and natural language understanding.

Representative scientific publications 
 A.C.C. Say, S. Kuru "Qualitative system identification: deriving structure from behavior". Artificial Intelligence 83 (1), 75-141
 A. Yakaryılmaz, A.C.C. Say "Unbounded-error quantum computation with small space bounds". Information and Computation 209 (6), 873-892

Work in popular media
Cem Say has an active profile in popular media. He has delivered several TEDx conference talks in Turkey on artificial intelligence and robots. He has appeared many times in national television channels in Turkey as a popular science commentator. He has authored three popular science books in Turkish: 50 Soruda Yapay Zekâ (Artificial Intelligence in 50 Questions), Yeni Dünya, Yeni Ağ (New World, New Web), and En Hakiki Mürşit (The Truest Guide). He has a weekly column on science-related topics in the weekly newspaper Oksijen. He has an active Twitter presence, where he tweets on a daily basis on popular science and current political issues.

References

External links
 Cem Say's professional home page
 
 

1966 births
Living people
Academic staff of Boğaziçi University
Scientists from Istanbul